The Jack Dyer Medal is an Australian rules football award given each season to the player or players adjudged best and fairest for the Richmond Football Club.

The award is now named in honour of Jack Dyer, a champion ruckman who won the award five times from 1937 to 1946. He was one of the inaugural "Legends" inducted into the Australian Football Hall of Fame in 1996.

Other multiple winners have been Kevin Bartlett (five times); Wayne Campbell and dual Brownlow Medallist Roy Wright (four times each); Ron Branton, Neville Crowe, Geoff Raines, Brownlow Medallist Bill Morris, and Trent Cotchin (three times each).  Basil McCormack, Jack Titus, Leo Merrett, Des Rowe, Dave Cuzens, Royce Hart, Maurice Rioli, Dale Weightman, Matthew Knights, Tony Free, Joel Bowden, Brett Deledio, Dustin Martin, and most recently Jack Riewoldt have all won the award twice.

Bill Morris, Roy Wright, Ian Stewart, Trent Cotchin and Dustin Martin all won the best and fairest in the same years that they won their Brownlow Medals at Richmond, while Stan Judkins, Brownlow Medallist in 1930, never won the club's award.

The voting system as of the 2017 AFL season, consists of each player receiving a ranking from zero to five after each match by the coaching panel.

Recipients

Multiple winners

Removed winners

Following a nineteen-year investigation undertaken by members of the Richmond Historical Committee, it was announced in November 2019 that their research into the history of the award had discovered that 18 of the 22 awards between 1911 and 1936 (none had been listed in 1912, 1915, and 1930-1931) were not actually presented at the time, but were erroneously added retrospectively in 1988 and 1991. 

This caused a degree of controversy, as this resulted in Jack Dyer's record tally of six medals being reduced to five (with his 1932 award being removed), equal with Kevin Bartlett. In addition, Ray Martin also had his back-to-back medals reduced to one (his 1934 award was removed), and a further twelve players - including those from the club's earliest years in the VFL/AFL, members of the club's 1920-1921 premiership teams, and teammates of Dyer - had all of their awards removed from the records.

References 
General

Specific

Australian Football League awards
Richmond Football Club
Australian rules football-related lists